Ninez Cacho-Olivares (19 July 1941 – 3 January 2020) was a Filipino journalist, having worked in the industry for over 20 years as a feature writer and political columnist in various Manila broadsheets such as the Bulletin Today, Philippine Daily Inquirer, Business Day and Business World. She was publisher and editor-in-chief for the Philippine Post prior to becoming The Daily Tribunes publisher and editor-in-chief.

She was known to be a staunch defender of former Philippine President Joseph Ejército Estrada.

She died on 3 January 2020, at the age of 78.

References 

1941 births
2020 deaths
Filipino journalists
Filipino women journalists
Filipino newspaper publishers (people)
RPN News and Public Affairs people
Filipino columnists
20th-century newspaper publishers (people)
21st-century newspaper founders